Christian Alliance P.C. Lau Memorial International School (CAPCL) and Christian Alliance International School (CAIS) are two international schools that provides Christian education. The school uses the curriculum of Alberta Education. It is a non-profit organization founded by the Kowloon Tong Church of the Chinese Christian and Missionary Alliance (KTAC).

History
CAIS began operation in September 1992 with approximately 40 secondary school students. In 1995, the school expanded to include elementary education. Christian Alliance College relocated to Tuen Mun, New Territories in 1992 in phases. The last class of Christian Alliance College in Ma Tau Chung campus was held in 1995–96 academic year.

Christian Alliance P.C. Lau Memorial International School closed down after the new campus was opened in Butterfly Valley under the name "Christian Alliance International School" in 2017.

In 2020, the original campus in Ma Tau Chung was re-opened under the original full name Christian Alliance P.C. Lau Memorial International School.

Academics
The school maintains an evangelical Christian environment and requires all students to speak English. CAPCL utilizes the curriculum of Alberta Education with a bilingual program at all grade levels. The medium of instruction is approximately 65% English and 35% Chinese (Mandarin with traditional script).

References

External links
 
 Official website of Christian Alliance International School (Butterfly Valley)

Primary schools in Hong Kong
Educational institutions established in 1992
Christian and Missionary Alliance
International schools in Hong Kong
Protestantism in Hong Kong
Ma Tau Chung
1992 establishments in Hong Kong